Clemente Ovalle Barbosa (born 5 October 1982) is a Mexican former professional footballer, who last played as a midfielder for Mérida. He made his debut March 12, 2005 against Chiapas in a game which resulted in a 1–1 tie. With 5 minutes left during the final between Atlante vs. Pumas UNAM, Clemente scored the winning goal.

Honours
Atlante
Apertura 2007

References

External links

 Clemente Ovalle's Statistics

1982 births
Living people
Footballers from Nuevo León
C.F. Monterrey players
Liga MX players
Sportspeople from Monterrey
Association football midfielders
Mexican footballers